Going the Limit is a 1925 American silent drama film directed by Duke Worne and starring Ashton Dearholt, Ruth Dwyer and Garry O'Dell. It was shot at studios in San Francisco.

Synopsis
A gang gain control over a San Francisco millionaire by posing as clairvoyants. They kidnap his daughter, but are foiled by a young man she is in love with who chases them across the city.

Cast
 Ashton Dearholt as Ted Van Brunt 
 Ruth Dwyer as Helen Hayward
 Garry O'Dell as Lung Duck
 Miriam Fouche as 	Meg
 Robert James Cosgriff as Eddie
 Hal Stephens as Dr. Rosaro
 Rupert Drum as Lorenzo Hayward

References

Bibliography
 Munden, Kenneth White. The American Film Institute Catalog of Motion Pictures Produced in the United States, Part 1. University of California Press, 1997.

External links
 

1925 films
1925 drama films
1920s English-language films
American silent feature films
Silent American drama films
Films directed by Duke Worne
Films shot in San Francisco
1920s American films